Everything Is Nice: The Matador Records 10th Anniversary Anthology is a 3-disc compilation of Matador tracks from 1989 to 1999 from popular Matador artists such as Pavement, Modest Mouse, Mogwai and Cat Power. Also featuring relatively unknown artists such as Jega and Non Phixion. Alternate names for this compilation include: Don’t Be Afraid of the Product and Chain Gang Video Not Included. Included in the digipak release are 3 CDs and a booklet including the complete Matador discography as of 8/16/1999.

An excerpt from the booklet states, “Cigarettes Are Nice. Feet Are Nice. Police Are Nice. Typhoons Are Nice. James Woods is Nice.”

Track listing

Disc: 1
 Stereo - Pavement
 Count Five Or Six - Cornelius
 Talk About The Blues – The Jon Spencer Blues Explosion
 Cross Bones Style – Cat Power
 Flight '96 – Chavez
 Fire In The Middle – Nightmares On Wax
 Refuse To Lose – Non Phixion
 Pitbull – Jega
 NO TECH! – Unwound
 Cosmic Rays – Helium
 Maximum Sunshine - The Lynnfield Pioneers
 Fujiyama Attack – Guitar Wolf
 Heart Cooks Brain – Modest Mouse
 Flux – Bardo Pond

Disc: 2
 Xmas Steps – Mogwai
 Sugarcube – Yo La Tengo
 The Official Ironmen Rally Song – Guided By Voices
 Banned From The End Of The World – Sleater-Kinney
 One Louder Solex – Solex
 The Banjo's Categorical Gut – Matmos
 Here We Go – Arab Strap
 Booker To Hooker - Khan
 Image Of You – Red Snapper
 Blaze – Arsonists
 Roygbiv – Boards Of Canada
 Do The Strand - Burger Ink
 Tanzen - Pole
 X-Factor - Void

Disc: 3
 Windblown - The Lynnfield Pioneers
 Naked - The Jon Spencer Blues Explosion
 Sleepwalkers - Non Phixion
 Universal Skills - Arsonists
 One Two Three Four Five Six Seven Eight Nine Ten Barbie Dolls – Pizzicato Five
 Oh Cripes! - Solex
 Body Dump (Super-8 Mix) - Khan
 Schtumm – The Wisdom Of Harry
 Sugarcube (Live) - Yo La Tengo
 Grounded (Crooked Rain Version) - Pavement
 Choking Tara (Creamy Version) - Guided By Voices
 Aging Astronauts II - Mary Timony
 Long Ride - Bardo Pond
 Hugh Dallas - Mogwai
 Sea Of Love - Cat Power

1999 compilation albums
Matador Records compilation albums
Record label compilation albums
Indie rock compilation albums
Alternative rock compilation albums